Knoxboro is a hamlet in Oneida County, New York, United States. Knoxboro has a post office with ZIP code 13362.

References

Hamlets in Oneida County, New York
Hamlets in New York (state)